Ab Bakhshan may refer to:
 Ab Bakhshan, Markazi, a village in Iran
 Ab Bakhshan, Mazandaran, a village in Iran